Tom Lexley William Cooper (born 26 November 1986) is an Australian–Dutch cricketer who played for South Australia in Australian domestic cricket and for the Brisbane Heat in the Big Bash League (BBL). He is a right-handed middle order batsman and a right-arm off-spinner, and in addition to representing the Netherlands, he has represented Australia in the Under-19 Cricket World Cup.

Cooper was born in Lismore in New South Wales, but after his youth career he moved to Adelaide and began playing domestic cricket for South Australia, earning a spot in their side in November 2008. Early in his career he stood out in limited overs matches, and his breakout performance came in a match for the Prime Minister's XI against a touring West Indies team, when he scored 160 not out. In 2009, Cooper discovered he was eligible to play for the Netherlands national cricket team due to his Dutch passport, and he has represented the country in a World Cup and two World Twenty20s. He is the older brother of fellow Netherlands cricketer Ben Cooper.

Career

Youth career
Cooper was in Australia's under-19 team for the 2006 Under-19 Cricket World Cup, and in the lead up to the tournament he made his Youth ODI debut against India. Cooper scored the first century of the World Cup in Australia's first match against South Africa. He got to a hundred after 138 balls and finished with 104 runs. He followed this up with another great performance against Sri Lanka, scoring 84 runs off 93 balls in a 9-wicket win. Across ten Youth ODIs for Australia he averaged 41.44 runs and scored at a rate of 87.76 runs per 100 balls.

Early career (2008–2010)

Though Cooper started his cricket career in New South Wales, he was unable to break into their side, and was instead sought by South Australia, who saw him as an investment for the future. Cooper first played for South Australia in a Sheffield Shield match against Western Australia at Adelaide Oval, scoring 10 in South Australia's only innings. He then made his one-day debut for South Australia against Western Australia in a Ford Ranger Cup match at Adelaide Oval, opening the innings and scoring 53 from 67 deliveries. In his fourth one day match he scored his first century against New South Wales for South Australia which he made 101 from only 108 deliveries. For part of his innings he was at the crease with experienced Pakistani Test cricketer Younis Khan for a 128-run partnership, significantly outscoring Younis Khan who only managed to score 29 runs. Cooper also managed to score his maiden Twenty20 fifty in the second Twenty20 of his career in January 2009.

Cooper was selected to play for the Australian Institute of Sports in an Emerging Players Tournament over the 2009 winter, batting at number 3 and holding the team together with little support on multiple occasions. In the 2009–10 season Cooper's one-day form improved with three fifties for South Australia in the 2009–10 Ford Ranger One Day Cup season, including a brutal score of 78 runs from just 45 balls with three sixes and eight fours in a seven-wicket win over Tasmania. His breakout performance came near the end of the season when he played a tour match for the Prime Minister's XI against the West Indies cricket team. After Chris Gayle had blasted 146 runs for the Windies, Cooper outdid him with 160 not out from 120 balls, hitting six sixes and 14 fours.

Playing for Netherlands (2010–2014)

Cooper qualified to play for the Netherlands national cricket team as his mother was born in Dutch New Guinea. He applied for a Dutch passport to make travel to Europe easier, and while playing for a club in Scotland the Dutch coach, Peter Drinnen, discovered he was in Europe on a Dutch passport and asked if he wished to play for the Netherlands. The Koninklijke Nederlandse Cricket Bond, the governing body of cricket in the Netherlands, arranged for him to play domestic cricket in the Netherlands before he joined their national team as there is controversy surrounding players from full members of the ICC playing for other countries.

Cooper was eligible to play for the Netherlands in both the English forty-over competition and the One Day Internationals the side played, but not for their first-class matches in the ICC Intercontinental Cup. After playing for the Netherlands during their 2010 Clydesdale Bank 40 campaign, he made his One Day International debut for the Netherlands in a match against Scotland, in which he scored an unbeaten 80 to help his side to a six-wicket victory in Rotterdam. He was named the Man-of-the-Match for his performance.

Cooper became the first cricketer to score half-centuries in each of his first three One Day Internationals after he followed up his first innings with 87 against Scotland in his next match and then 67 against Kenya in his third game to start the 2010 ICC World Cricket League Division One competition. He narrowly missed a fourth consecutive half-century when he made 39 against Canada in his fourth match. At the end of tournament he continued his string of good form with his maiden century and a score of 96 in two matches against Afghanistan. After the tournament his ODI batting average was 81.33, though this was against all Associate members of the ICC. He played several more one-day matches for the Netherlands during the 2010 season, including against Bangladesh, a Zimbabwe XI and Ireland.

Cooper returned to play for South Australia during the 2010–11 season. He was included in the Netherlands' 15-man squad for the 2011 World Cup. The team lost all six of their matches and were knocked out in the first round. With 174 runs Cooper was the Netherlands' second-highest run-scorer in the tournament behind Ryan ten Doeschate. After scoring 47 in the opening match against England, Cooper's solitary half century came in the next match amidst the Netherlands' 215-run defeat to the West Indies. Batting at number three Cooper scored 55 not out as his side was dismissed for 115.

Further international matches (2011–2014)
Cooper again played for the Netherlands in the 2011 season. He score an impressive 100-ball 126 in the Clydesdale Bank 40, then almost secured a win in an ODI against Scotland, scoring 75 runs and fighting late in the innings for the win with only the Dutch tail for assistance. When he returned to play for South Australia again in the 2012–12 season, he immediately had an impact and scored a match-winning century in the first one-day match of the season. He perfectly timed his innings to reach 100 as he hit the winning runs with an over to spare. He also helped force a draw in a Sheffield Shield match against New South Wales, scoring 98 in the first innings with little support, then an unbeaten double century in the second innings to play out the fourth day and temporarily become the competition's top run-scorer.

The Netherlands were one of three teams not from the Caribbean invited to participate in the Caribbean Twenty20 held in January 2012, however Cooper missed the tournament which clashed with the Big Bash League, Australia's remarketed Twenty20 competition. Cooper played for the Adelaide Strikers and scored 101 runs from five matches at an average of 33.66 and with a highest score of 43 not out. After the BBL he had another match-winning performance with 60 not out to lead South Australia to an unlikely one-wicket victory over Victoria despite an extraordinary Jon Holland spell of 6/29. At the auction for the 2012 Indian Premier League, Cooper was one of three players from Associate teams in the auction, which included 144 people.

Cooper was included in Australia A's 17-man squad to tour England in July 2012. Before the 2012–13 season he changed BBL teams from the Strikers to the Melbourne Renegades. He had a standout season in the 2013–14 season, one of few Redbacks successful with the bat in the 2013–14 Ryobi One-Day Cup with 294 runs, the second most in the team. He was recognised by the club as the most outstanding Redback of the season.

Cooper was selected to play again for the Netherlands in the 2014 ICC World Twenty20, replacing Tim Gruijters due to a back injury. Gruijters claimed that his back problem was a recurring one which the team had known about previously, that he was fit to play and that the only reason he'd been omitted from the team was because Cooper had become available after the Redbacks missed out on the Sheffield Shield final. The ICC said that the correct process of obtaining independent medical advice had been followed, so they allowed Cooper to play in the tournament. Cooper was the second-highest run-scorer of the entire tournament, playing seven matches and scoring 231 runs at an average of 57.75 and a strike-rate of 137.50.

Later career (2014–present)
In the 2014 winter Cooper played for Australia A in a quadrangular series due to Phillip Hughes pulling out from the team. His highest score of the tournament was a century against the National Performance Squad. Cooper was at the non-strikers end on 25 November 2014 when Hughes, then both his teammate and his roommate, was struck by a cricket ball in his neck. Hughes died in hospital two days later and Cooper was one of three cricketers to be pallbearers at Hughes' funeral.

In February 2015, Cooper signed for Somerset County Cricket Club for the whole of the 2015 English county season. He was eligible to play for the club without being counted as an international player due to his Dutch passport. During the season he scored two centuries for the club, one in a one-day match against Durham and one in a first-class match against Hampshire, as well as having a match-winning bowling performance against Warwickshire with figures of 5/76. This was his only season with Somerset because in future seasons he was no longer eligible to play under his Dutch passport.

During the 2015–16 season Cooper's form declined. The Redbacks were patient and waited for him to improve, but he was dropped from the team for the last three games of the Sheffield Shield season. On 15 April 2016, Cooper lost his contract with South Australia after his poor season. Despite his poor form for South Australia and not having played an international match since the 2014 World Twenty20, Cooper was again selected to play for the Netherlands in the 2016 World Twenty20, though he didn't perform as well as in the previous edition, only scoring 15 runs from 2 innings.

Despite having lost his contract with South Australia, Cooper continued to play for them in both the One Day Cup and the Sheffield Shield. He top-scored for the Redbacks in the Sheffield Shield with 736 runs at an average of 38.73, and midway through the season he'd played enough matches to get upgraded to a contract. Cooper's form, along with a successful Shield season for the Redbacks, meant at the end of the season he was able to play in the first Sheffield Shield final of his career. After the season he was given a new contract with South Australia for the 2017–18 season.

In November 2019, following strong performances in domestic games in Australia, Aaron Finch suggested that Cooper could play for Australia in the 2020 ICC Men's T20 World Cup, with Finch saying "he brings a lot to the team with bat and ball, and in the field".

In April 2021, Cooper was one of five players to be dropped by the South Australia cricket team, following a season without any wins. In June 2022, Cooper played for the Netherlands against England, a gap of almost nine years since his last ODI match.

See also
 List of South Australian representative cricketers

References

External links

 

Living people
1986 births
Australian cricketers
Dutch cricketers
Netherlands One Day International cricketers
Netherlands Twenty20 International cricketers
Cricketers at the 2011 Cricket World Cup
Somerset cricketers
South Australia cricketers
Adelaide Strikers cricketers
Melbourne Renegades cricketers
Cricketers from New South Wales
St Kitts and Nevis Patriots cricketers
Sportspeople from Wollongong
Dutch people of Australian descent
Brisbane Heat cricketers
Australian expatriate sportspeople in England
Dutch expatriate sportspeople in England
Expatriate sportspeople in Saint Kitts and Nevis